Hajan is a town and a notified area committee in Bandipora district in the Indian union territory of Jammu and Kashmir.
|Postal_code.              = 193501

Geography
It has an average elevation of 1556 metres (5104 feet).
Hajan is at a distance of 35 km towards north of Srinagar .

Demographics
 India census, Hajan had a population of 9916. Males constitute 52% of the population and females 48%. Hajan has an average literacy rate of 32%, lower than the national average of 59.5%: male literacy is 42%, and female literacy is 21%. In Hajan, 14% of the population is under 6 years of age. Hajan has a population of approximately 23,000 as of 9 December 2007.
Public facilities provided are as
Community Health Center providing facility all adjoining area's of Hajan town
Govt. Degree College 
ITI Hajan educating youth various professional courses 
Tehsil Office
Various private and Govt. schools
Nearest tourist attraction Manasbal Lake

References

Cities and towns in Baramulla district